Vicenza is a city in northeastern Italy. It is in the Veneto region at the northern base of the Monte Berico, where it straddles the Bacchiglione River.

Vicenza is a thriving and cosmopolitan city, with a rich history and culture, and many museums, art galleries, piazzas, villas, churches and elegant Renaissance palazzi. With the Palladian Villas of the Veneto in the surrounding area, and his renowned Teatro Olimpico (Olympic Theater), the "city of Palladio" has been listed as a UNESCO World Heritage Site since 1994.

In December 2008, Vicenza had an estimated population of 115,927 and a metropolitan area of 270,000. Vicenza is the third-largest Italian industrial centre as measured by the value of its exports, and is one of the country's wealthiest cities, in large part due to its textile and steel industries, which employ tens of thousands. Additionally, about one fifth of the country's gold and jewelry is made in Vicenza, greatly contributing to the city's economy. Another important sector is the engineering/computer components industry (Federico Faggin, the microprocessor's co-inventor, was born in Vicenza).

History

Roman era 
Vicentia was settled by the Italic Euganei tribe and then by the Paleo-Veneti tribe in the 3rd and 2nd centuries BC. The Romans allied themselves with the Paleo-Veneti in their fight against the Celtic tribes that populated north-western Italy. The Roman presence in the area grew exponentially over time and the Paleo-Veneti (whose culture mirrored Etruscan and Greek values more so than Celtic ones) were gradually assimilated.  In 157 BC, the city was a de facto Roman centre and was given the name of Vicetia or Vincentia, meaning "victorious".

The citizens of Vicetia received Roman citizenship and were inscribed into the Roman tribe Romilia in 49 BC. The city was known for its agriculture, brickworks, marble quarry, and wool industry and had some importance as a way-station on the important road from Mediolanum (Milan) to Aquileia, near Tergeste (Trieste), but it was overshadowed by its neighbor Patavium (Padua). Little survives of the Roman city, but three of the bridges across the Bacchiglione and Retrone rivers are of Roman origin, and isolated arches of a Roman aqueduct exist outside the Porta Santa Croce.

During the decline of the Western Roman Empire, Heruls, Vandals, Alaric and his Visigoths, as well as the Huns laid waste to the area, but the city recovered after the Ostrogoth conquest in 489 AD, before being conquered by the Byzantine Empire soon after. It was also an important Lombard city and then a Frankish center. Numerous Benedictine monasteries were built in the Vicenza area, beginning in the 6th century.

Middle Ages 
In 899, Vicenza was destroyed by Magyar raiders.

In 1001, Otto III handed over the government of the city to the bishop, and its communal organization had an opportunity to develop, separating soon from the episcopal authority. It took an active part in the League with Verona and, most of all, in the Lombard League (1164–1167) against Emperor Frederick I Barbarossa compelling Padua and Treviso to join: its podestà, Ezzelino II il Balbo, was captain of the league. When peace was restored, however, the old rivalry with Padua, Bassano, and other cities was renewed, besides which there were the internal factions of the Vivaresi (Ghibellines) and the Maltraversi (Guelphs).

The tyrannical Ezzelino III from Bassano drove the Guelphs out of Vicenza, and caused his brother, Alberico, to be elected podestà (1230). The independent commune joined the Second Lombard League against Emperor Frederick II, and was sacked by that monarch (1237), after which it was annexed to Ezzelino's dominions. On his death the old oligarchic republic political structure was restored – a consiglio maggiore ("grand council") of four hundred members and a consiglio minore ("small council") of forty members – and it formed a league with Padua, Treviso and Verona. Three years later the Vicentines entrusted the protection of the city to Padua, so as to safeguard republican liberty; but this protectorate (custodia) quickly became dominion, and for that reason Vicenza in 1311 submitted to the Scaligeri lords of Verona, who fortified it against the Visconti of Milan.

Vicenza came under the rule of the Republic of Venice in 1404, and its subsequent history is that of Venice. It was besieged by the Emperor Sigismund, and Maximilian I held possession of it in 1509 and 1516.

Early modern era 
Vicenza was a candidate to host the Council of Trent.

The 16th century was the time of Andrea Palladio, who left many outstanding examples of his art with palaces and villas in the city's territory, which before Palladio's passage, was arguably the most downtrodden and esthetically lacking city of the Veneto.

After the Fall of the Venetian Republic in 1797, under Napoleonic rule, it was made a duché grand-fief (not a grand duchy, but a hereditary (extinguished in 1896), nominal duchy, a rare honor reserved for French officials) within Napoleon's personal Kingdom of Italy for general Caulaincourt, also imperial Grand-Écuyer. One of the consequences of the city's occupation was the destruction of a prized silver model of the city, the Jewel of Vicenza.

19th century and later 
After 1814, Vicenza passed to the Austrian Empire. In 1848, however, the populace rose against Austria, more violently than in any other Italian centre apart from Milan and Brescia (the city would receive the highest award for military valour for the courage displayed by revolutionaries in this period). As a part of the Kingdom of Lombardy–Venetia, it was annexed to Italy after the Third War of Italian independence.

Vicenza's area was a location of major combat in both World War I (on the Asiago plateau) and World War II (a focal center of the Italian resistance), and it was the most damaged city in Veneto by Allied bombings, including many of its monuments; the civil victims were over 2,000. The end of World War II was followed by a period of depression, caused by the devastation during the two world wars. In the 1960s, the whole central part of Veneto, witnessed a strong economic development caused by the emergence of small and medium family businesses, ranging in a vast array of products (that often emerged illegally) that paved the way for what would be known as the "miracolo del nord-est" ("miracle of the northeast").
In the following years, the economic development grew vertiginously. Huge industrial areas sprouted around the city, massive and disorganized urbanization and employment of foreign immigrants increased.

Vicenza is home to the US Army post Caserma Ederle (Camp Ederle), also known as the U.S. Army Garrison Vicenza. In 1965, Caserma Ederle became the headquarters of the Southern European Task Force, which includes the 173d Airborne Brigade. In January 2006, the European Gendarmerie Force was inaugurated in Vicenza.

Geography

Climate

Demographics 

In 2007, there were 114,268 people residing in Vicenza, located in the province of Vicenza, Veneto, of whom 47.6% were male and 52.4% were female. Minors (children ages 18 and younger) totalled 17.17% of the population, compared to pensioners, who number 21.60%. This compares with the Italian average of 18.06% (minors) and 19.94% (pensioners). The average age of Vicenza residents is 43 compared to the Italian average of 42. In the five years between 2002 and 2007, the population of Vicenza grew by 3.72%, while Italy as a whole grew by 3.85%. The current birth rate of Vicenza is 9.16 births per 1,000 inhabitants compared to the Italian average of 9.45 births.

In 2010, 83.5% of the population was Italian. From 1876 to 1976 it has been calculated that over 1,000,000 people from the province of Vicenza have emigrated, with more than 3,000,000 people of Vicentino descent living around the world (most common migrational currents included Brazil, the United States, Canada, Australia, Germany, France, Belgium and Switzerland) escaping the devastation left by poverty, war and sickness. Today, almost 100,000 Vicenza citizens live and work abroad. Today, the city has morphed from a land of emigration to a land of immigration. The largest immigrant group comes from the United States (about 9,000 people, partly due to the presence of the military base). Other ethnic minorities comes from other European nations (the largest being Serbia, Romania, and Moldova), South Asian (the largest being Bangladesh and Pakistan), sub-saharan Africa, and North Africa (largest is from Morocco). The city is predominantly Roman Catholic, but due to immigration, it now has some Orthodox Christian, Muslim and Sikh followers.

Government

Architecture 

In 1994 UNESCO inscribed "Vicenza, City of Palladio" on its list of World Heritage Sites. In 1996, the site was expanded to include the Palladian villas outside the core area, and accordingly renamed "City of Vicenza and the Palladian Villas of the Veneto".

Palladio's works 
Vicenza is home to twenty-three buildings designed by Palladio. Famous examples include:

 Villa Almerico Capra (also known as "La Rotonda"), located just outside the downtown area
 Basilica Palladiana, centrally located in Vicenza's Piazza dei Signori, of which Palladio himself said that "it might stand comparison with any similar work of antiquity"
 Teatro Olimpico (Olympic Theater), designed for the Accademia Olimpica (Olympic Academy) and begun to be built in 1580, when Palladio died. The wooden scenes are by Vincenzo Scamozzi.
 Palazzo Chiericati, home of the city pinacotheca
 Palazzo Barbaran da Porto, home of the Museo Palladio
 Palazzo del Capitaniato, home of the city council
 Palazzo Porto
 Palazzo Porto in Piazza Castello (incomplete)
 Palazzo Thiene Bonin Longare (built by Vincenzo Scamozzi)
 Palazzo Thiene
 Villa Gazzotti Grimani, in the frazione Bertesina

Other sights

Churches 
Some of the main historical churches:
 Cathedral of Vicenza (church of Santa Maria Annunciata), dating from early in the 11th century, and restored in the 13th, 16th, 19th and after the ruinous destruction of World War II, possesses a number of paintings and sculptures, nearly all of them by Vicentine artists; the dome and north side door were designed by Andrea Palladio.
 Basilica Sanctuary of Saint Mary of Monte Berico: the structure was completed in two stages, creating two churches in different styles: the first in 1428 in Gothic style, the second in 1703 by Carlo Borella, designed as a late-baroque style basilica. The adjacent convent, houses the large The Supper of Saint Gregory the Great canvas by Paolo Veronese. The bell tower (1826) was designed by Antonio Piovene. The basilica commemorates two apparitions of Our Lady to Vincenza Pasini, a pious woman who lived in a village in the province, and the liberation of the city from a terrible plague.
 Basilica of Santi Felice and Fortunato: church built in the 4th century within a Roman cemetery and expanded in the 5th century to house the relics of the martyrs Felice and Fortunato. In the 9th century, the city, and the church, were razed by the Hungarians; by the 10th century, the church had been re-erected by the bishop Rodolfo with the support of Emperor Otto II. It has the layout of a paleochristian basilica, initially rectangular, then doubled in width and divided into three naves. After the Hungarian invasions, the Benedictines built a new baptistery and the semicircular apse, adding the bell tower and the rosette, as well as a series of blind arches and a Byzantine cross in front. In later centuries, the interiors underwent a radical alteration, enriching it with Baroque altars and decorations. A 20th century restoration removed many of these embellishments. Next to the church there is a small museum exhibition with archaeological finds from the church and from the nearby Roman necropolis.
 Santa Corona: one of the oldest and most important churches of the city, this 13th century church first endowed by the bishop of Verona, the Blessed Bartholomew of Breganze, to shelter one of the thorns from Christ's crown. It was under the purview of the Dominicans after the death of Ezzelino III da Romano. It houses paintings by Montagna (The Magdelene), Bellini (Baptism of Christ) and others; the crypt hosts the Valmarana chapel by Palladio. The church underwent a major restoration in 2012.
 San Giorgio in Gogna: one of the oldest churches in the city, built before the year 1000. with a Romanesque facade. The outer walls consist of agglomerates of different materials (brick, stone, marble salvaged from other buildings) are clearly a demonstration of the origin of the construction craft, which can be seen especially in the polygonal apse. It was restored by the diocese in 2011.
 San Lorenzo (1280): church built by minorites in mixed Gothic and Lombard Romanesque styles. Located along Corso Fogazzaro facing the central Piazza San Lorenzo, it hosts the tombs of illustrious Vicentines and is served by the Conventual Franciscans.
 Santa Maria Nova: late 16th-century church is the only religious architecture designed and built by Palladio in Vicenza, apart from the Valmarana chapel and the limited interventions in the cathedral.
 Santa Maria in Araceli (1244): church later refurbished by Guarini in Baroque style, formerly belonged to the Clarisses, contains statues by Orazio Marinali and Cassetti, and the reproductions of original altarpieces by Piazzetta and Tiepolo (now at the Pinacotheca Civica).
 Santa Maria of the Servites: church in Piazza Biade adjacent to the Piazza dei Signori, was commissioned in the early 15th century by the order of the Servants of Mary. The church portal was executed in the studio where Andrea Palladio worked at the beginning of his career and would be one of his earliest works. In the cloister in 1319 took place miracles of St. Philip Benizi de Damiani.
 Santa Maria Etiopissa (1154): a simple stone and brick structure church.
 San Marco in San Girolamo (early 18th century): late baroque church built by the Discalced Carmelites on a previous convent and church of the Jesuati. The architect is unknown, but inside it is clear the influence of the style of the Venetian Giorgio Massari. After the Napoleonic abolition of the religious orders and their convents, it became in 1810 the church of San Marco, one of the oldest parishes in the city. It hosts many works by Vicentine and Venetian artists of the early 18th century, including some masterpieces. The sacristy preserves the complete original furniture of the time.
 San Vincenzo: church dedicated to Saint Vincent of Saragossa – ancient patron of Vicenza – overlooks Piazza dei Signori, facing the Basilica Palladiana, interrupting the smooth texture of the Palazzo del Monte di Pietà. The church was built from the 14th century to the 18th. The baroque façade (1614–1617) hosts two lodges with three arches, in Corinthian and composite style. The lodges are surmounted by a crown with Christ mourned by angels, by Giambattista Albamese, also author of the five statues in the pediment. Behind the lodge there is the ancient church of 1387, offset in relation to the building that has incorporated, with the altar facing east. The interior of the church, as amended in 1499 and again in the 18th century by Francesco Muttoni, was restored in the 1920s. It hosts the ark of Simone Sarego (14th century), the impressive altar, rococo work of Bernardo Tabacco, and the altar of Pietà, masterpiece of a young Orazio Marinali (1689). Within the porch, a red marble stele is engraved with the ancient official linear measures of the Community of Vicenza.
 Sant'Agostino: church built upon older buildings in the 14th century, the ancient convent of Saint Augustine is located on the western outskirts of the city, giving its name to the parish and to the frazione. The abbey church was rebuilt in Romanesque style during the rule of Can Grande della Scala between 1322 and 1357. The church has a rich decoration and a large altarpiece of 1404 by Battista da Vicenza.
 Oratory of San Nicola da Tolentino: finished in 1678 on commission of the fraternity of St. Nicholas, it is a chapel that houses a series of paintings focused on the life of the saint, among the highest levels of the measured Baroque of Vicenza.
 The Churches of the Carmini (1372) and St. Catherine (1292), formerly belonging to the Humiliati, possess notable pictures.
 Santa Croce (1179)
 Santi Filippo and Giacomo (12th century)

Secular buildings 
 The Torre Bissara (clock tower) (1174), at 82 meters high, is one of the tallest buildings
 The Biblioteca Civica Bertoliana, a public library founded by Count Giovanni M. Bertolo and opened in 1708
 Casa Pigafetta (1440), house of Antonio Pigafetta
 The Pinacotheca Civica houses mainly Vicentine paintings in the Palladian Palazzo Chiericati

Libraries 
 Biblioteca Civica Bertoliana, a public library founded by Count Giovanni M. Bertolo and opened in 1708
 International Library La Vigna, a specialized library

Economy and infrastructure 
The surrounding country is predominantly agricultural. Major products are wine, wheat, corn,  olive oil ( in the Barbarano area ) and cherries and asparagus are a particularity of Bassano. There are also quarries of marble, sulphur, copper, and silver mines, and beds of lignite and kaolin; mineral springs also abound, the most famous being those of Recoaro.

Massive industrial areas surround the city and extend extensively in the western and eastern hinterland, with numerous steel and textile factories located in the Montecchio Maggiore, Chiampo and Sovizzo area in the west and Camisano Vicentino and Torri di Quartesolo in the east, areas characterised by a disorganised and extensive cementifaction.

Elitè sectors are the jewelry and clothing factories. Important vicentino clothing firms include: Diesel, Pal Zileri, Marzotto, Bottega Veneta, Marlboro Classics etc. The Gold Exposition is world-famous and it takes place in Vicenza twice a year (January and September).

Other industries worthy of mention are the woollen and silk, pottery, tanneries, and musical instruments. The headquarters of the bicycle component manufacturer Campagnolo and the protective wear for sports manufacturer Dainese are located here.

Transport 
Vicenza railway station, opened in 1846, forms part of the Milan–Venice railway, and is also a junction of two branch lines, to Schio and Treviso, respectively.

Sport 
Vicenza is home to Vicenza Hurricanes American Football team which currently plays in League 2. Founded in 2009, the Hurricanes have a junior team and a senior team with a roster of 35+ athletes.

Vicenza is home to football club L.R. Vicenza Virtus, formerly Lanerossi Vicenza and Vicenza Calcio, which currently compete in Serie B. Their home venue is the Stadio Romeo Menti.

Vicenza is home to Rangers Rugby Vicenza, A rugby union team who compete in Serie A2.

Cuisine and popular dishes 

Vicenza's cuisine reflects its humble, agricultural past. Simple, hearty meals made with fresh local ingredients that reflect the province's geographical diversity.

Unlike Venetian cuisine where fish reigns supreme, game meat, cheeses and vegetables take center stage accompanied by polenta, soft from the stove or day-old sliced and grilled over the fireplace embers, better yet cooked in a pan under the spit where it lightly fries in meat drippings to create a crunchy golden outer crust.

Vicenza is known for its simple dishes, and often famous cheeses, fruits, ingredients and wines, such as sopressa Vicentina, Asiago cheese, Marostica cherries, Nanto truffles, Bassano asparagus and Breganze Cabernet wine.

 Baccalà alla Vicentina
 Risi e bisi (rice and green peas)
 Polenta e Osei
 Bigoli all'Arna (thick fresh egg noodles with duck ragout)
 Putana (in this case not the vulgar term meaning "whore", but a fruit cake traditionally made with poor ingredients such as old bread or polenta and dried fruit such as raisins)

The inhabitants of Vicenza are jokingly referred to by other Italians as mangiagatti, or "cat eaters". Purportedly, Vicentini turned to cats for sustenance during times of famine, such as during World War II.

Notable residents 

 The Bloody Beetroots – Death Crew 77, band
 Tekoser Malatesta, YPG International fighter
 Amy Adams, American actress, born in Vicenza
 Lewis Albanese. A Medal of Honor recipient during Vietnam War.
 Giovanni Maria Angiolello, traveller and historian
 Francesco Aviani, painter
 Sebastiano Carlise, singer, writer
 Giuseppina Bakhita, saint
 Flavio Albanese, architect
 Roberto Baggio, football player
 Fernando Bandini, writer
 Valerio Belli, sculptor and engraver
 Maria Bertilla Boscardin, saint
 Ottavio Bertotti Scamozzi, architect
 Miki Biasion, rally driver
 Marzia Bisognin, YouTube celebrity
 Gelindo Bordin, athlete
 Roberto Busa, religious and informatic engineer
 Aulus Caecina Alienus, Roman general
 Gentullio "Tullio" Campagnolo, bicycle component maker and inventor
 Domenico Cerato, priest and architect
 Francesco Chieregati, papal nuncio, bishop
 Bartolomeo Cittadella, painter
 Carlo Cracco, chef, television personality
 Luigi Da Porto, writer
 Alby Sabrina Pretto, ballerina
 Almerico da Schio, astronomer and inventor
 Otello De Maria, painter
 Ilvo Diamanti, political scientist
 Federico Faggin, inventor
 Adolfo Farsari, photographer
 Ferreto dei Ferreti, historian (14th century)
 Antonio Fogazzaro, writer
 Antonio Giuriolo, partisan
 Graziano Giacomello, musician, composer, producer, artisan bag designer
 Jessie James, singer
 Fedele Lampertico, economist, writer and politician
 Niccolò Leoniceno, medic
 Paolo Lioy, naturalist
 Luigi Meneghello, writer (professor at Reading University)
 Romeo Menti, football player of the Grande Torino, died in the Superga air disaster
 Francesco Muttoni, architect
 Andrea Palladio, architect
 Goffredo Parise, writer
 Antonio Pigafetta, explorer, companion of Ferdinand Magellan
 Guido Piovene, journalist and writer
 Joseph  Pivato Canadian writer and academic, born in Tezze sul Brenta
 Orlando Pizzolato, athlete
 Sergio Romano, diplomat and historian
 Paolo Rossi, football player
 Mariano Rumor, politician
 Sonia Gandhi, Indian politician, wife of former Indian Prime Minister Rajiv Gandhi.
 Flo Sandon's, singer
 Vincenzo Scamozzi, architect
 Gian Antonio Stella, journalist and writer
 Sharon Tate, American actress and model, attended Vicenza American High School
 Tiziano Treu, politician
 Vitaliano Trevisan, writer and actor
 Gian Giorgio Trissino, humanist and poet (1478–1553)
 Antonio Turra, botanist and physician (1736–1797)
 Guido Vedovato, painter
 Nicola Vicentino, theorist and composer
 Giacomo Zanella, writer and priest

International relations

Sister cities 
Vicenza is twinned with:
  Annecy, France (1995)
  Pforzheim, Germany (1991)
  Wuxi, China (2006)
  Cleveland, Ohio, United States (2009)

See also 
 Roman Catholic Diocese of Vicenza

References

General sources

Citations

External links 
 Official site of the comune
 Heraldica.org Napoleonic heraldry
 Video introduction to Teatro Olimpico by Andrea Palladio
 Vicenza city web Portal | VICENZA.COM
 Guide of Vicenza | VICENZA.COM
 Webcam on Vicenza's main square Piazza dei Signori, viewing the Basilica Palladiana of Andrea Palladio | VICENZA.COM
 Vicenza events calendar | VICENZA.COM
 Vicenza Outdoor Activities

 
Cities and towns in Veneto
Territories of the Republic of Venice
World Heritage Sites in Italy